Air Vice-Marshal Gavin Douglas Anthony Parker,  is a former senior Royal Air Force officer and was formerly the Head of the British Defence Staff and Defence Attaché in Washington, D.C.

Early life and education
Parker was born on 22 February 1969 in Harare, Zimbabwe (at the time called Salisbury, Rhodesia). He studied physics at the University of Newcastle, England, and graduated with a Bachelor of Science (BSc) degree in 1990. He later studied at King's College London, and graduated with a Master of Arts (MA) degree in defence studies in 2006.

Military career
Parker was commissioned into the Royal Air Force on 30 September 1990. He became Air Officer Scotland and station commander at RAF Leuchars in 2011, Assistant Chief of Staff, Plans and Policy at the Ministry of Defence in 2013, and Air Officer Commanding No. 2 Group in 2015. After that he became Head of the British Defence Staff and Defence Attaché in Washington, D.C. in August 2017. Parker retired from the RAF on 29 September 2020.

Parker was appointed Companion of the Order of the Bath (CB) in the 2019 Birthday Honours.

References

|-

|-

|-

|-

Living people
Officers of the Order of the British Empire
Royal Air Force air marshals
British air attachés
Year of birth missing (living people)
Companions of the Order of the Bath
People from Harare
Alumni of King's College London